Pieksämäen maalaiskunta is a former municipality of Finland. On January 1, 2004 it was joined to new municipality of Pieksänmaa with Jäppilä and Virtasalmi.

Pieksämäki
Populated places disestablished in 2004
Former municipalities of Finland